Campnosperma seychellarum is a species of plant in the family Anacardiaceae. It is endemic to Seychelles.  It is threatened by habitat loss.

References

seychellarum
Endemic flora of Seychelles
Trees of Seychelles
Endangered flora of Africa
Taxonomy articles created by Polbot